Momo is a type of steamed filled dumpling, with origins from Tibet. Momo is native to Tibet, Nepal as well as Indian Himalayan Region of Ladakh, Sikkim, Assam, and Arunachal Pradesh, Himachal Pradesh, Uttarakhand, and Darjeeling. It is popular across a wider region of the Indian subcontinent. Recently, it has also hit in many international markets. Momo is similar to Chinese baozi, jiaozi, and mantou, Mongolian buuz, Japanese gyoza, Korean mandu and Turkic manti, but heavily influenced by cuisine of the Indian subcontinent with spices and herbs. Momo are extremely popular and can be found in every kind of shop from restaurants to street vendors.

Origin 
Momo is the colloquial form of the Tibetan word "mog mog". It is possible that this Tibetan word is borrowed from the Chinese term momo (馍馍), a name traditionally used in northwestern Chinese dialects for bread. The word mo (馍) itself means food related to flour. As can be seen in dishes from Shaanxi cuisine like roujiamo and paomo. It could also be possible that it derived from Nepal Bhasa word mome (मम) which means cooking by steaming. The history of momo in Nepal dates back to as early as the fourteenth century. 

As for the Himalayan momo, it is not quite known whether it spread from the Kathmandu valley of Nepal to Tibet or the other way around. This dish was initially popular among the Newar community of the Kathmandu Valley of Nepal, one prevalent belief is that traveling Nepali Newar merchants took the recipe of momo from Tibet where the Nepali Newar Merchants used to go to trade and brought it back home to Nepal. Some argue that momo was introduced in Tibet by a Nepalese Newari princess who was married to a Tibetan king in the late fifteenth century, since in Newari, one of Nepal’s oldest languages, ‘mome’ means cooking by steaming. In Tibet, the filling of the dish was typically meat, such as yak and occasionally potatoes and cheese. Traditional Tibetan momo is quite different from the Nepalese one as the former was made with a thicker dough and with little to no spices except salt. However, after arriving in the Indo-Gangetic Plains, the meat became chicken, and mixed vegetables momo was introduced to feed the large population of vegetarian Hindus. Unproven, but substantiated by the dates and references to momo in colloquial references, the civil war in Nepal pushed out the Nepali diaspora to seek a livelihood in India, which further increased to the prevalence of Himalayan style momo in the southern half of India especially in the cities of Chennai and Bangalore.

Description

Momo is a type of steamed dumpling with some form of filling, most commonly chicken (traditionally yak, but often chicken and goat) and it is originally from Tibet. Momo has become a delicacy in Nepal and Tibetan communities in Bhutan, as well as people of the Indian regions of Darjeeling, Ladakh, Sikkim, Assam, Uttarakhand, Himachal Pradesh and Arunachal Pradesh.

Production

A simple white-flour-and-water dough is generally preferred to make the outer momo covering. Sometimes, a little yeast or baking soda is added to give a more doughy texture to the finished product.

Traditionally, momo is prepared with ground/minced meat, potatoes, and leek filling. Nowadays, the fillings have become more elaborate and Momo is prepared with virtually any combination of ground meat, vegetables, tofu, mushrooms, paneer cheese, soft chhurpi (local hard cheese) and vegetable and meat combinations.

 Meat: Different types of meat fillings are popular in different regions. In Nepal, Tibet, Ladakh, Sikkim, Bhutan, pork, chicken, goat meat and buffalo meat are commonly used. In the Himalayan region of Nepal and India, lamb and yak meat are more common. Minced meat is combined with any or all of the following: onions/shallots, garlic, ginger and cilantro/coriander. Some people also add finely puréed tomatoes and soy sauce.
 Vegetables: Finely chopped cabbage, carrot, soy granules, potato, flat bean (lilva kachori) or chayote (iskush) are used as fillings in India and Nepal.
 Cheese: Usually fresh cheese (paneer) or the traditional soft chhurpi is used. This variety is common in India and Eastern Nepal.
 Khoa: Momo filled with milk solids mixed with sugar are popular as a dessert in the Kathmandu Valley.

The dough is rolled into small circular flat pieces. The filling is enclosed in the circular dough cover either in a round pocket or a half-moon or crescent shape. People prefer meat with a lot of fat because it produces flavourful, juicy momos. A little oil is sometimes added to the lean ground/minced meat to keep the filling moist and juicy. The dumplings are then cooked by steaming over a soup (either a stock based on bones or vegetables) in a momo-making utensil called mucktoo. Momos may also be pan-fried or deep-fried after being steamed.

Varieties
Momo are traditionally steamed but can also be deep-fried or pan-fried and cooked in soup. Momo is usually served with chilli garlic sauce and pickled daikon in Tibet. In Nepal, popular dipping sauces include tomato-based chutneys or sesame or peanut or soybean-based sauces called Jhol achar. Sauces can be thick or thin in consistency depending on the eatery (locally called achār), usually made with tomato or peanut, sesame and soybean as the base ingredient. In Kathmandu valley, the traditional way of serving momo (called momochā or local momo) is ten ping-pong ball-sized round momo drowned in a sauce called jhol achar, infused with Timur pepper (Nepali pepper, a variety of Sichuan pepper). Jhol momo has warm or hot tomato-based broth poured over momo (not cooked in the broth), whereas Jhol achhar is served in-room /cooled temperature. One of the main ingredients of jhol achar is Nepali hog plum (lapsi), but if this is unavailable, lemon or lime juice may be used.

Soup momo or mok-thuk (Tibetan) is another way to serve momos which usually involve using smaller shaped dumplings, where the momos are either cooked in broth for a type of dumpling soup or steamed momos, which are added to the broth. Pan-fried momo is also known as kothey momo. Steamed momo served in hot sauce is called C-momo. There are also a variety of dumplings of Nepal found in the Indian state of Sikkim and Darjeeling district, including Tingmo and Tiebao.

Gallery

See also

 Baozi
 Jiaozi
 Mantou
 List of dumplings

References

Dumplings
Tibetan cuisine
Bhutanese cuisine
Newari cuisine
Nepalese cuisine
Indian cuisine
Fast food